KITR may refer to:

Kit Carson County Airport
KIT receptor, a membrane-bound receptor for mast/stem cell growth factor